Peat is an accumulation of decayed vegetation matter.

Peat may also refer to:
Peat (surname), people with the surname Peat
Peat Island, New South Wales, Australia
Peat Marwick, accounting firm, predecessor of KPMG

See also
Peet (disambiguation)
Pete (disambiguation)